Johan (JT) Linde (born 27 June 1983 in Adelaide, South Australia) is an Australian amateur boxer of Estonian descent. He represented Australia at the 2012 London Olympic Games in the super heavyweight division and was Australian team captain at the 2013 World Amateur Boxing Championships in Almaty, Kazakhstan.

He started boxing at the age of 15 at the ASG Boxing Club in Adelaide under the tutelage of Colin Betty and Paul Totalis. Mick Campion took over as head coach and prepared Johan for the 2012 Australian Titles and 2012 Oceania Championships, which he won and booked at spot on the 2012 London Olympic Team. His other coaches were Paul Panos, Mick Daly and Gerry Murphy.

His amateur boxing record for 68 fights is 57 wins with 32 KOs and 11 losses. Some notable opponents include Anthony Joshua (2012 A.Socikas Tournament, Lithuania), Joseph Parker (2012 Belgrade Winner Tournament, Serbia), Junior Fa (2012 Oceania Championships) and Joe Goodall (2013 and 2014 Australian Championships).

He holds degrees in economics and commerce with a major in accounting from the University of Adelaide and now works as an economic advisor to the NSW Premier Dominic Perrottet. He was also a director of Boxing Australia for four years.

Boxing career
Linde started boxing in 2001 and was crowned South Australian heavyweight (91 kg) champion in 2003 and 2004. However, he gave up boxing to pursue tertiary studies in 2005, where he completed two bachelor's degrees (economics and accounting) at the University of Adelaide.

In 2009, Linde returned to the boxing gym and fought competitively for the first time in six years in 2010, moving up to the super heavyweight division (+91 kg). Linde went on to win the 2012 Australian and regional 2012 Oceania titles to qualify for the 2012 London Olympic Games, beating the highly rated Tongan Junior Fa in the final, who in turn had beaten Joseph Parker in the semi-final. This was his first time Linde had represented Australia at an international tournament.

Interview after Olympic qualification.

In the lead up to the London Olympic Games, Linde fought Joseph Parker in the 2012 Belgrade Winner final, narrowly losing on a countback. One week later, Linde suffered a TKO against Anthony Joshua at the 2012 A. Socikas Tournament in Lithuania, the first stoppage in his career.

Linde lost in the round of 16 at the London Olympics to Chinese super heavyweight Zhilei Zhang, who was the silver medallist at the 2008 Beijing Olympics in the same weight division.
After reaching the world level in amateur boxing, Linde wasn't able to penetrate into the top of the amateur ranks, losing his first fight to Uzbekistan at the 2013 World Boxing Championships in Kazakhstan and only winning a bronze medal at the 2014 Australian Titles, losing to Joseph Goodall in the semi-final.

Linde retired from competitive boxing in 2014 to resume his career in finance and is now actively involved in helping boxers with both training and promotion. He is also a director of Boxing Australia, chairman of the Boxing Australia Athletes Commission and National Federation representative for boxing with the Australian Olympic Committee.

Boxing highlights 
8x Australian caps including 2012 London Olympic Games and 2013 World Amateur Boxing Championships.

1x Oceania Champion (2012)

1x Australian Champion (2012)

2x Australian Titles Silver medal (2003, 2013)

1x Australian Titles Bronze medal (2014)

6x South Australian Champion (2003, 2004, 2010, 2011, 2012, 2013)

References 

1983 births
Living people
Sportspeople from Adelaide
Australian Institute of Sport boxers
Boxers at the 2012 Summer Olympics
Olympic boxers of Australia
Australian people of Estonian descent
Australian male boxers
Super-heavyweight boxers